Chepigana District is a district (distrito) of Darién Province in Panama. The population according to the 2000 census was 27,461, and had risen to 30,110 in the 2010 census, prior to the creation of Santa Fe District. The capital lies at the town of La Palma.

On 14 July 2017, the National Assembly decreed the separation of seven corregimientos from Chepigana District to create Santa Fe District, which took effect in 2018.

Administrative divisions
Since 2018, Chepigana District has been divided into the following corregimientos:

La Palma
Camoganti
Chepigana
Garachiné
Jaqué
Puerto Piña
Sambú
Setegantí
Taimatí
Tucutí

References

Districts of Darién Province